Vyacheslav Victorovich Bulanov (born 3 September 1970, Moscow) is a Russian ice hockey referee active in the Kontinental Hockey League and on international scene.

Career
He is an experienced international referee having officiated in two Winter Olympics and nine World Hockey Championships (eight as a referee). He has officiated over 400 games in the KHL.

References

External links
Вячеслав Буланов: О своей судейской мечте никому не говорю

1970 births
Living people
Ice hockey people from Moscow
Russian ice hockey officials